Michael Christopher Jelenic (born May 12, 1977) is an American  animator, storyboard artist, screenwriter, producer, and director. He is best known for co-developing the animated series Teen Titans Go! alongside Aaron Horvath for Cartoon Network as well as co-writing and co-producing the feature film Teen Titans Go! To the Movies and co-directing the upcoming film The Super Mario Bros. Movie with Horvath.

He also developed Batman: The Brave and the Bold with James Tucker and the 2011 TV series ThunderCats with Ethan Spaulding, which both aired on Cartoon Network and were made by Warner Bros. Animation.

Filmography

Film

Television

Shorts

References

External links

Animators from California
American storyboard artists
American animated film directors
American animated film producers
American television directors
American television producers
Warner Bros. Animation people
American people of Croatian descent
1977 births
Living people